School of Champions  is a 1950 Argentine adventure drama film
directed by Ralph Pappier, and starring George Rigaud, Silvana Roth, and Pedro Quartucci.  It won the Silver Condor Award for Best Film, given by the Argentine Film Critics Association in 1951 for the best picture of the previous year.

Cast
George Rigaud as Alexander Watson Hutton
Silvana Roth as Margaret Budge
Pedro Quartucci
Enrique Muiño as Faustino Sarmiento
Enrique Chaico		
Carlos Enríquez
Héctor Coire		
Gustavo Cavero	
Pablo Cumo		
Hugo Mújica	
Eduardo Ferraro 		
Francisco Ferraro 		
Marcos Zucker 			
Warly Ceriani 		
Oscar Villa

References

External links
 

1950 films
1950s adventure drama films
1950s Spanish-language films
Argentine black-and-white films
Films directed by Ralph Pappier
Argentine adventure drama films
1950 drama films
1950s Argentine films